Jewar is a town and a nagar panchayat in Gautam Buddha Nagar District in the Indian state of Uttar Pradesh.

Location
It is on the northeast bank of the Yamuna River.

History
The ancient name of the town was Jáwáli , so called in honour of its founder , a Brahman anchorite. Brahmans still hold possession here, and most of land belongs to them.

Overview 
History records that the town was named after the sage Maharshi Jaawali. Other temples in the town is the Devi Mandir and the Daau ji Mandir famous for the Dau ji Mela held every year in the month of September.

It is located in the outskirts of Greater Noida, the district headquarters are located in Greater Noida itself. A 6-lane wide Yamuna Expressway connects Jewar from Greater Noida and Agra. This whole district (Gautam Buddha Nagar) including Noida/ Greater Noida is said to be one of the most fast developing areas of India.

Before 1997, Jewar and Dankaur were parts of the Bulandshahr district. Now Jewar & Dankaur along with Dadri and Bisrakh (earlier parts of Ghaziabad district) are parts of Gautam Buddha Nagar district.

Demographics
As of 2011 Indian Census, Jewar had a total population of 32,269, of which 17,188 were males and 15,081 were females. Population within the age group of 0 to 6 years was 5,095. The total number of literates in Jewar was 18,184, which constituted 56.4% of the population with male literacy of 63.8% and female literacy of 47.9%. The effective literacy rate of 7+ population of Jewar was 66.9%, of which male literacy rate was 75.9% and female literacy rate was 56.7%. The Scheduled Castes population was 7,087. Jewar had 4623 households in 2011.

Connectivity 
Jewar is mainly connected to other Major sites through roads and rail network. People commute to Delhi by rail from Palwal, Khurja and Wair. Palwal is city of Haryana, Initially part of Faridabad district but from 2008, Palwal is a separate district. Some state bus also run two times a day to Greater Noida District center.
In the west is Haryana state. Jewar itself is a Tehsil, and well connected to many tehsils and districts by road namely Khurja, Sikandrabad, Bulandshahr, Khair, Aligarh and Palwal (District - Faridabad in Haryana). Noida Metro Rail Corporation (NMRC) planning to build a monorail project connecting Noida to Agra with monorail (yet not confirmed).

Noida International Airport is under-construction to connect NCR with other international cities via building an airport at near town of Jewar.

Geography 

References 

Cities and towns in Gautam Buddh Nagar district